HMS Belliqueux (Eng. warlike) was a 64-gun third rate ship of the line of the Royal Navy, launched on 5 June 1780 at Blackwall Yard, London. She was named after the French ship  captured in 1758.

In 1781 Belliqueux took part at the Battle of Fort Royal, and in 1782 she was at the Battle of the Saintes.

In 1796 she came under the command of Captain John Inglis who commanded her bravely during the Battle of Camperdown in October 1797.

At the action of 4 August 1800, Belliqueux captured the French frigate Concorde.

At Madras, the captains of the eight East Indiamen in the convoy joined together to present Captain George Byng, of Belliqueux, a piece of silver plate worth £100 as a token of appreciation for his conduct while they were under his orders. Byng wrote his thank you letter to them on 24 April.

Philip Dundas, Lieutenant-Governor of Penang died on-board Belliqueux on 8 April 1807, while Belliqueux was in the Bay of Bengal.

Belliqueux was employed as a prison ship from 1814, and was broken up in 1816.

Citations and references
Citations

References

Ships of the line of the Royal Navy
Ardent-class ships of the line
1780 ships
Ships built by the Blackwall Yard